Michael T. Cooley (c. 1927 – June 13, 1988) was an American football player and coach.  He served as the head football coach at Lehigh University from 1962 to 1964, compiling a record of 5–21–1.  Cooley played college football at the University of Georgia from 1944 to 1947 under Wally Butts.  He graduated from Georgia in 1948.  Cooley died at the age of 60 on June 15, 1988 at Emory University Hospital in Atlanta, Georgia.

Head coaching record

References

Year of birth uncertain
1920s births
1988 deaths
American football centers
Georgia Bulldogs football players
Lehigh Mountain Hawks football coaches